William Fulton Beith Mackay  (12 August 1922 – 6 June 1987) was a Scottish actor and playwright, best known for his role as prison officer Mr. Mackay in the 1970s television sitcom Porridge.

Early life
Mackay was born in Paisley, Renfrewshire, Scotland. He was brought up in Clydebank by a widowed aunt after the death of his mother from diabetes. His father was employed by the NAAFI.

On leaving school, he trained as a quantity surveyor and later volunteered for the Royal Air Force in 1941 but was not accepted because of a perforated eardrum. He then enlisted with the Black Watch and he served for five years during the Second World War, which included three years spent in India.

Career

Theatre work
After being demobbed, Mackay began training as an actor at RADA. His first work was with the Citizens' Theatre, Glasgow, where he performed in nine seasons between 1949 and 1958. He also worked at the Royal Lyceum Theatre, Edinburgh before gaining notice at the Arts Theatre Club, London, where in 1960, he played the part of Oscar in The Naked Island, a play about POWs in Singapore.

In 1962, he appeared at the same theatre, in Russian playwright Maxim Gorki's play The Lower Depths for the Royal Shakespeare Company. He then acted with the Old Vic company and the National Theatre, performing in such productions as Peer Gynt and The Alchemist. Other roles for the RSC included Mr Squeers in Nicholas Nickleby and the drunken gaoler in Die Fledermaus.  In 1972, he played the part of Hughie in the Royal Lyceum Theatre Company's production of Bill Bryden's play, Willie Rough.

Mackay was a director of the Scottish Actors' Company and, in 1981, a founder of the Scottish Theatre Company, playing Willie Souden in the company's production of Bill Bryden's play, Civilians, set in wartime Greenock. Surprisingly, despite his status, he appeared in few films. After his screen debut in the 1952 film I'm a Stranger, his most notable roles were those in Gumshoe, Britannia Hospital, Local Hero and Defence of the Realm.

Television work
Mackay was acknowledged as a strong character actor in various television series.

He is best remembered for his namesake role from 1973 to 1977 as the comically ferocious prison warder, Mr Mackay, in the British sitcom Porridge alongside the comedian and comedy actor Ronnie Barker. He also appeared in the film version of the series. The ensemble playing of Mackay, Barker, Richard Beckinsale and Brian Wilde, and the writing by Dick Clement and Ian La Frenais, made Porridge one of the most successful comedy series of the 1970s. He returned to the role of Mr Mackay, now nearing retirement from the Prison Service, in the first episode of Going Straight (1978), the sequel series to Porridge.

Before coming to prominence in Porridge, Mackay made several appearances in The Avengers, one particular episode being Return of the Cybernauts in which he played Professor Chadwick; he also played DI Inman in Special Branch (1969–71). His other work included Coronation Street and Z-Cars. He appeared as RAF psychiatrist Fowler in an episode of Some Mothers Do 'Ave 'Em and as a doctor in Doctor at Large in 1971.

In 1968 he played John Everett in The Saint: The Best Laid Schemes and Willie in "The Saint: The Convenient Monster". He was cast as misguided scientist Doctor John Quinn in the 1970 Doctor Who story Doctor Who and the Silurians and was later seriously considered by producer Barry Letts to play the Fourth Doctor when Jon Pertwee announced he was leaving the role in 1973.

He played a regular officer running a training course in the Dad's Army episode "We Know Our Onions" (1973), a doctor in "The Miser's Hoard" (1977), and a detective in a Wodehouse Playhouse episode (1978). 

He often stayed true to his Scottish roots, acting in productions such as Three Tales of Orkney and The Master of Ballantrae, and as former Prime Minister Bonar Law in the 1981 TV series The Life and Times of David Lloyd George. He played the Captain in the British version of the Jim Henson children's series, Fraggle Rock (1984–1987). In one of his last performances, Mackay portrayed an art forger in the Lovejoy episode "Death and Venice".

Playwriting
Under the pseudonym of Aeneas MacBride, he wrote plays for the BBC.

Personal life

Mackay was married to Irish actress Sheila Manahan. 

He did much work for the Glasgow children's charity Child and Family Trust. 

He was awarded the OBE in 1984 and greatly enjoyed oil painting.

Mackay died on 6 June 1987 at the age of 64, from stomach cancer. He was buried at East Sheen Cemetery in southwest London. His widow, Sheila, died in 1988 and was buried with her husband.

Partial filmography

Film

TV

References

External links

1922 births
1987 deaths
British Army personnel of World War II
Deaths from cancer in England
Deaths from stomach cancer
Male actors from Paisley, Renfrewshire
Scottish male film actors
Scottish male television actors
Alumni of RADA
20th-century Scottish male actors
Scottish dramatists and playwrights
Officers of the Order of the British Empire
Black Watch soldiers